Quaschwitz is a municipality in the district Saale-Orla-Kreis, Thuringia, Germany.

References 

Municipalities in Thuringia
Saale-Orla-Kreis